McGees Mills is an unincorporated community in Clearfield County, Pennsylvania, United States. A gristmill operated by Henry Holmes McGee eventually resulted in the name. The McGees Mills Covered Bridge crosses the West Branch of the Susquehanna River at McGees Mills.

References

Unincorporated communities in Clearfield County, Pennsylvania
Unincorporated communities in Pennsylvania